Silence of Northern Hell is the debut album by Japanese melodic death metal band Blood Stain Child. It was released in 2002, by the Captain Rock label. Their debut album features symphonic elements and power metal music as the main basis for its composition.

Track listing
 "Silence of Northern Hell" – 3:41  
 "Crimson Symphony" – 4:45  
 "Under the Sin of Grief" – 5:42 
 "Legend of Dark" – 4:03 
 "Requiem" – 4:49  
 "King of the Sacred Sword" – 4:50  
 "Infernal World" – 3:25

Personnel
 Ryo – lead vocals, bass guitar
 Ryu – lead guitar
 Daika – rhythm guitar
 Aki – keyboards, piano, backing vocals
 Violator – drums, percussion

References

2002 debut albums
Blood Stain Child albums
Pony Canyon albums